Cleft lip and palate transmembrane protein 1 (Clptm1) is a multi-transmembrane protein that in humans is encoded by the CLPTM1 gene. Clptm1 was characterized in 1995 as a surface membrane protein in the thymus during embryonic development in mice and is suggested to have an important role in T-cell development. A more recent study shows a role in GABAA receptor subunit intracellular anchoring and regulation resulting in an influence on synaptic strength Clptm1 belongs to a family of several eukaryotic cleft lip and palate transmembrane protein 1 sequences. 

Cleft lip with or without cleft palate is a common birth defect that is genetically complex. The non-syndromic forms have been studied genetically using linkage and candidate-gene association studies with only partial success in defining the loci responsible for orofacial clefting. CLPTM1 encodes a transmembrane protein and has strong homology to two Caenorhabditis elegans genes, suggesting that CLPTM1 may belong to a new gene family. This family also contains the Homo sapiens cisplatin resistance related protein CRR9p which is associated with CDDP-induced apoptosis.

References

Further reading